Larry O. Sather (December 28, 1940 – October 2, 2022) was an American politician who was a Republican member of the Pennsylvania House of Representatives.

Sather was a 1959 graduate of Huntingdon Area High School.

Sather was first elected to represent the 81st legislative district in the Pennsylvania House of Representatives in 1992. He retired prior to the 2006 elections. Sather died on October 2, 2022, in Huntingdon at the age of 81.

References

External links
  official PA House profile (archived)

1940 births
2022 deaths
People from Huntingdon County, Pennsylvania
Republican Party members of the Pennsylvania House of Representatives